The 1986–87 Ohio State Buckeyes men's basketball team represented Ohio State University during the 1986–87 NCAA Division I men's basketball season. Led by first-year head coach Gary Williams, the Buckeyes finished 20–13 (9–9 Big Ten) and reached the second round of the NCAA tournament.

Roster

Schedule/results

|-
!colspan=9 style=| Regular Season

|-
!colspan=9 style=|NCAA Tournament

Rankings

Awards and honors
Dennis Hopson – Big Ten Player of the Year

References

Ohio State Buckeyes men's basketball seasons
Ohio State
Ohio State